Pratap Sarnaik is a politician from Thane, Maharashtra, India. At present he is Member of the Legislative Assembly – Ovala-Majiwada (Vidhan Sabha constituency), Communication Leader- Mira Bhayander, Shivsena, Chairman- Vihang Group of companies, Founder & President- Sanskruti Yuva Pratishthan.

Biography and political life
Pratap Sarnaik was born in Maharashtra middle-class family in 1964 at Wardha to Indirabai & Baburao Sarnaik. His father Sri Baburao Sarnaik migrated to Mumbai. Pratap Sarnaik attended the Pendharkar College in Dombivli. A liking for social service made him join the Students Movement during his college days. Pratap Sarnaik started his political career with the Nationalist Congress Party (NCP). He left the NCP in November 2008 and joined the Shiv Sena.

He won the General elections, from Ovala-Majiwada (Vidhan Sabha constituency) as Shiv Sena candidate with 52,373 votes.
His 2 sons, Vihang and Purvesh are key members of Yuva Sena. Younger son Purvesh Sarnaik is Secretary of Yuva Sena and actively involved in its activities and campaigns. His wife Mrs. Parisha Sarnaik too is a local corporator in Thane Municipal Corporation representing Ward 29.

Social Activities
Sanskruti Yuva Pratishthan, headed by Pratap Sarnaik organizes Dahi Handi at Vartak Nagar, Thane for the past many years. Various Dahi Handi teams from all over Mumbai-Thane flocked to compete for the Rs 25 lakh Handi in August 2011.

Business

Real Estate
As Chairman of Vihang Group of companies, he is involved in many real estate projects in Thane City since 1989. Few of residential/ commercial projects executed are Vihang Shantivan, Vihang Garden, Srushti Complex, Vihang Residency, Vihang Tower, Vihang Vihar, Vihang Park, Raunak Tower, Vihang Arcade & Raunak Arcade.

Hospitality
Pratap Sarnaik owns Hotel Vihang's Inn – a 3-Star business hotel at Thane. The group also owns Vihang's Palm club which offers swimming pool, health club, jacuzzi and squash.

Positions held
 2009: Elected to Maharashtra Legislative Assembly
 2014: Re-elected to Maharashtra Legislative Assembly
2019: Re-elected to Maharashtra Legislative Assembly

References

External links 
 Official website of MLA Pratap Sarnaik
 Shiv Sena Home Page

People from Thane
Marathi politicians
Shiv Sena politicians
Living people
Maharashtra MLAs 2014–2019
Politics of Thane district
Year of birth missing (living people)